Bolboschoenus medianus is a flowering plant in the sedge family, Cyperaceae, that is native to Western Australia.

The grass-like plant is rhizomatous and perennial producing red-brown flowers.

It found in and along lakes and creeks along coastal areas in a couple of isolated areas in the Peel and South West regions where it grows in muddy soils.

References

medianus
Plants described in 1972
Angiosperms of Western Australia